The 1999 NCAA Division I Men's Swimming and Diving Championships were contested in March 1999 at the Indiana University Natatorium in Indianapolis, Indiana at the 76th annual NCAA-sanctioned swim meet to determine the team and individual national champions of Division I men's collegiate swimming and diving in the United States. The men's and women's titles would not be held at the same site until 2006.

Auburn topped the team standings, finishing 53 points ahead of defending champions Stanford. It was the Tigers' second overall title, second title in three years, and the second for coach David Marsh.

Team standings
Note: Top 10 only
(H) = Hosts
(DC) = Defending champions
Full results

See also
List of college swimming and diving teams

References

NCAA Division I Men's Swimming and Diving Championships
NCAA Division I Swimming And Diving Championships
NCAA Division I Men's Swimming And Diving Championships
NCAA Division I Men's Swimming and Diving Championships